Maratha is a small village located in the Famagusta District of Cyprus, 7 km south of Lefkoniko. It is under the de facto control of Northern Cyprus.

The village was recorded as early as the early 13th century in papal documents.

In 1974 a mass-grave containing the bodies of more than 80 murdered Turkish-Cypriots men, women and children was found here. These were the people who were massacred by the EOKA-B in the Maratha, Santalaris and Aloda massacre during the Turkish invasion of Cyprus.

See also
Santalaris

References

Communities in Famagusta District
Populated places in Gazimağusa District